U-68 may refer to one of the following German submarines:

 , a Type U 66 submarine launched in 1915 and that served in the First World War until sunk 22 March 1916
 During the First World War, Germany also had these submarines with similar names:
 , a Type UB III submarine launched in 1917 and sunk on 4 October 1918
 , a Type UC II submarine launched in 1916 and sunk on 17 March 1917
 , a Type IXC submarine that served in the Second World War until sunk on 10 April 1944

Submarines of Germany